The 129th season of the Victorian Football League was held in 2010. The North Ballarat Football Club won the premiership, its third flag in a row.

Teams
This season featured the addition of the Queensland-based Gold Coast Football Club to the league, the first new club in the VFL since Tasmania entered in 2001. Gold Coast's participation in the VFL was as part of the club's preparation for its entry into the Australian Football League in 2011: the club had played one season of under-18s football in the TAC Cup in 2009, then was to play one season of senior football in the VFL in 2010 before its AFL senior debut.

The VFL continued to serve as both the top state-level football league in Victoria, and as a reserves competition for Victorian-based clubs in the Australian Football League, as had been the case since 2000. The affiliation agreements between VFL and AFL clubs were unchanged from 2009.

Ladder

Finals
The preliminary finals and the reserves Grand Final were moved from TEAC Oval to Box Hill City Oval because heavy rain and frequent use during September had left TEAC Oval unplayable.

Grand Final

Awards
The J. J. Liston Trophy was jointly won by Steve Clifton (North Ballarat) and Shane Valenti (Port Melbourne), who each polled 20 votes. Ed Curnow (Box Hill) finished third on 13 votes, despite breaking his leg in Round 13 and missing the remainder of the season.
The Frosty Miller Medal was won by Matthew Little (Williamstown), who kicked 80 goals for the season.
The Fothergill-Round Medal was won by Michael Hibberd (Frankston)
The top three teams after the finals – North Ballarat, Northern Bullants and Williamstown – qualified for the 2011 Foxtel Cup.
Box Hill won the reserves premiership. Box Hill 17.20 (122) defeated Williamstown 16.9 (105) in the Grand Final, held as a curtain-raiser to the Seniors First Preliminary Final on 11 September.

Notable events
For the second consecutive season, Bendigo was not permitted to use its home ground Queen Elizabeth Oval after May due to an unfit surface. The club's remaining home matches were played at either Windy Hill or Strathfieldsaye Oval.

See also 
 List of VFA/VFL premiers
 Australian rules football
 Victorian Football League
 Australian Football League
 2010 AFL season

References

External links
AFL Victoria website
Official VFL website

Victorian Football League seasons
VFL